Francis Henry de la Motte, or François Henri de la Motte, was a French citizen and ex-French army officer executed in London for High Treason on 27 July 1781. He had been arrested in January 1781 on suspicion of being a spy, and held for six months in the Tower of London. At an Old Bailey trial on 23 July he was found guilty of running an operation which sent secret naval intelligence to France—a country which supported the rebellious American colonists, and with which Great Britain had been at war since 1778.

Specifically, the intelligence concerned British fleet dispositions at Portsmouth and other British ports. In July 1781 the War of American Independence was not over and the navies of Great Britain and France were still fighting each other  not only in the North Atlantic but as far afield as the Indian Ocean.

What sealed de la Motte's fate was the damning testimony of a former accomplice, Henry Lutterloh, who was the chief prosecution witness. Having been found guilty by the jury, the terrible sentence pronounced by the judge was that the prisoner be hanged, drawn and quartered. In fact de la Motte was spared some of the gruesome refinements — after hanging for nearly an hour, he was taken down and his heart cut out and burned, but he was not quartered, nor subjected to the refinements visited on David Tyrie, a Scottish spy, the following year. (Tyrie (whose trial was at Winchester) was also found guilty of sending naval intelligence to the French.  He was hanged for 22 minutes, following which he was beheaded and his heart cut out and burned. He was then emasculated, quartered, and his body parts put into a coffin and buried in the pebbles at the seaside.)

Public executions were considered a spectator sport in the eighteenth century, and when individuals of high rank were involved the attraction was irresistible. It was not just the lower orders who turned up to witness these occasions (see the diaries of George Selwyn). A crowd of more than 80,000 people witnessed de la Motte's execution at Tyburn. On this occasion people from all walks of life turned up to witness the edifying prospect of a handsome gentleman of rank, elegantly dressed, and in the prime of life, being ceremoniously butchered in public — "pour décourager les autres", French for "to discourage others".

De la Motte in English Literature 

De la Motte's life and execution resonated in the imagination of writers like Charles Dickens and W. M. Thackeray. The drama and language of the trial scene of Charles Darnay in A Tale of Two Cities is very close to that of de la Motte's trial, with Dickens emphasising the grotesqueness and the gruesomeness of the proceedings in his inimitable manner.

As for Thackeray, in his last, unfinished novel, Denis Duval we find de la Motte and his sometime accomplice, Henry Lutterloh, figuring there as leading characters. Thackeray portrays de la Motte as a tortured, demonic figure, which is not at all how he comes across in contemporary reports in the press. Still less is that the impression conveyed in a sympathetic memoir  published by a French writer some time between the trial verdict and the execution — in the hope (perhaps) of mitigating the severity of the sentence.

The official trial report is known for its obtuse grammar. It includes single sentences of nearly 4000 words.

References

External links 
 Denis Duval in Harper's new monthly magazine. / Volume 28, Issue 168, May, 1864 — text posted on the Library of Congress American Memory site.
 Paul Jones and Denis Duval by W. M. Thackeray — text available in Project Gutenberg.

1781 deaths
American Revolutionary War executions
18th-century French people
French people of the American Revolution
Executed French people
People executed by the Kingdom of Great Britain
People executed for treason against the United Kingdom
French people executed abroad
Year of birth unknown
People executed by the United Kingdom by hanging, drawing and quartering